Krishna Nagar is one of the most densely populated parts of the Agartala city and located almost in the middle of Agartala. Royal Ujjayanta Palace which is now visitors point formerly Tripura Legislative Assembly is situated west part of Krishna Nagar. The most visited temples of Agartala like Mehar Kalibari, Jagannnatha temple, Laxminarayana temple, Durgabari temple, Alekhbaba temple and Satsangha Bihar are situated very near and within this locality. Most of the renowned persons of the State of Tripura live here. Once Rabindranath Tagore also stayed in Krishna Nagar at the House of Colonel Mahim Thakur.

Some of the famous schools of Agartala like Umakanta Academy, Bijoy Kumar Girls School, Shishu Bihar English Medium School, Pragati Vidyabhawan, Dasarath Deb Memorial Hall, Muktodhara  Auditorium, Tripura Road Transport Corporation  Terminus are situated in this area. Even the DM's Office of West Tripura District, Tripura Public Service Commission, Directorate of Agriculture, Birchandra Public Library, IGM Hospital and Rabindra Satabarshiki Bhawan are located adjacent to Krishna Nagar. 

Most popular restaurants of the Agartala city like Cilantro, Curlies, Royal Cuisine, Rolling Joint, Feast, Wow Shawarma, Momos n More, Bakku's Bharta, Trinayani, Chathainog, Abba Cafe, Sartaj Cake Parlour & Restaurant, Cakes & Buns, Bonsai Restaurant, Tandur Chai, T4U, Delight, Tandoor Hut, Nibedito, Sherwali Sweets, Momo Magic Cafe Restaurant are located here. 

A set up is there for two days weekly market every Tuesday and Friday in front of MAGNET CLUB. 

This place is very popular among the youngsters and a very common place for hanging out.

Krishna Nagar is populated with both Tripuris and Bengalis living in harmony with each other. The biggest festival Durga Puja is celebrated with much devotion and enjoyment by local clubs like Skylark Club, Magnet Club, Sanghati Club, Red Lotus Club, Pole Star Club, New Boys Club, Cosmopolitan Club, Nine Bullet Club, KBC, Krishnanagar Club, UBST, Jewels Association, etc. Among these Magnet Club, Sanghati Club, Cosmopolitan Club are some of the Best local clubs.        

  

Similarly Christmas is celebrated with the same manner in Agartala city by Baptist church, Suparibagan, Krishna Nagar. Languages both Kokborak & Bengali are spoken in this locality. Nowadays lot of outsiders are migrating in Krishna Nagar.

Agartala